Shuttle Life is a 2017 Malaysian drama film directed by Tan Seng Kiat, starring Jack Tan, Sylvia Chang and Angel Chan. The film was scheduled to be released on October 12, 2017.

Cast
 Jack Tan as Qiang 
 Sylvia Chang as Li Jun 
 Angel Chan as Hui Shan
 Gan Mei Yan as Xiao Chuan 
 Juztin Lan as Bao Tou 
 Jack Yap as Fei

Production
Shuttle Life received support from National Film Development Corporation Malaysia. In 2014, the film won the top prize of NT$1 million cash grant from the Golden Horse Film Project Promotion (FPP). Filming took place over the course of 21 days in Pudu, Kuala Lumpur, Malaysia, in 2016.

Awards and nominations

References

External links 
 

2017 films
2010s Cantonese-language films
Malaysian drama films
2017 drama films
Films about mental health
2017 directorial debut films
2010s Mandarin-language films
2017 multilingual films
Malaysian multilingual films